Key is an unincorporated community in Cherokee County, Alabama, United States.

History
A post office called Key was established in 1880, and remained in operation until it was discontinued in 1936. The name comes from Lockey, a family of settlers.

References

Unincorporated communities in Cherokee County, Alabama
Unincorporated communities in Alabama